|}

This is a list of electoral district results of the 1962 Western Australian election.

Results by Electoral district

Albany

Avon

Balcatta 

 Two party preferred vote was estimated.

Bayswater

Beeloo 

 Two party preferred vote was estimated.

Belmont 

 Preferences were not distributed.

Blackwood

Boulder-Eyre 

 Two party preferred vote is estimated.

Bunbury

Canning

Claremont

Cockburn 

 Two party preferred vote was estimated.

Collie 

 Two party preferred vote was estimated.

Cottesloe

Dale

Darling Range

East Melville

Fremantle 

 Two party preferred vote was estimated.

Gascoyne

Geraldton 

 Two candidate preferred vote was estimated.

Greenough

Kalgoorlie

Karrinyup

Katanning

Kimberley

Maylands

Melville

Merredin-Yilgarn

Moore

Mount Hawthorn

Mount Lawley

Mount Marshall

Murchison 

 Two party preferred vote was estimated.

Murray

Narrogin

Nedlands

Northam

Perth 

 Two party preferred vote was estimated.

Pilbara

Roe

South Perth 

 Two candidate preferred vote was estimated.

Stirling

Subiaco

Swan

Toodyay 

 Two party preferred vote was estimated.

Vasse

Victoria Park

Warren

Wellington

Wembley

See also 

 1962 Western Australian state election
 Candidates of the 1962 Western Australian state election
 Members of the Western Australian Legislative Assembly, 1962–1965

References 

Results of Western Australian elections
1962 elections in Australia